Sallins and Naas railway station is located in the centre of the village of Sallins, County Kildare and also serves Naas, 3 km (2 miles) away. The station is in Dublin Short Hop Zone and as a result is the busiest station on the Kildare Line.

Feeder bus
A feeder bus operates between the station and the centre of Naas (Poplar Square & Post Office). There are several journeys in each direction throughout the day. The bus does not operate on Sundays.

History
Originally called "Sallins", it opened on 4 August 1846 and was the junction for the Tullow branch, which included the original Naas station. It closed in 1963, and was renamed Sallins & Naas upon re-opening in 1994.

See also
 List of railway stations in Ireland

References

External links
Irish Rail Sallins and Naas Station Website
NASRUG web forum

Iarnród Éireann stations in County Kildare
Railway stations opened in 1846
Naas
Railway stations in the Republic of Ireland opened in 1846